Rajya Sabha elections were held on various dates in 1965, to elect members of the Rajya Sabha, Indian Parliament's upper chamber.

Elections
Elections were held to elect members from various states.

Members elected
The following members are elected in the elections held in 1965. They are members for the term 1965-1971 and retire in year 1971, except in case of the resignation or death before the term.
The list is incomplete.

State - Member - Party

Bye-elections
The following bye elections were held in the year 1965.

State - Member - Party

 UP - Tribhuvan Narain Singh - CO ( ele  08/01/1965 term till 1970 )
 Madras  - G Lalitha Rajgopalan - INC ( ele  13/01/1965 term till 1970 )
 Manipur - Sinam Krishnamohan Singh - INC ( ele  13/01/1965 term till 1966 )
 Rajasthan - Jagannath_Pahadia - INC (  ele  02/03/1965 term till 1966 )21/03/1966
 WB  - Debabrata Mookerjee  - OTH ( ele  04/11/1965 term till 1968 )

References

1965 elections in India
1965